The Hungarian protests of 2011 were popular protests against the new constitution proposed by the parliamentary majority following the 2010 Hungarian parliamentary election, which came into force on 1 January 2012.

The new constitution met some resistance not only from the oppositional parties but also from the public. According to the critics it served to strengthen the power of the ruling party.

There were two large protests in Budapest, one on 17 March and another on 30 December. At these occasions protesters chanted slogans denouncing the prime minister and his "dictatorship". The protests also appealed to maintain the freedom of religion and against the flat 16% income tax.

See also
Taxation in Hungary
Hungarian Constitution

References

External links
 

Human rights in Hungary
Protests in Hungary
Protests in the European Union
2011 in Hungary
2011 protests
Opposition to Viktor Orbán